Paris–Le Bourget Airport  is an airport located within portions of the communes of Le Bourget, Bonneuil-en-France, Dugny and Gonesse,  north-northeast of Paris, France.

Once Paris's principal airport, it is now used only for general aviation, including business jet operations. It also hosts air shows, most notably the Paris Air Show. The airport is operated by Groupe ADP under the brand Paris Aéroport.

History
The airport started commercial operations in 1919 and was Paris's only airport until the construction of Orly Airport in 1932. It is famous as the landing site for Charles Lindbergh's historic solo transatlantic crossing in 1927 in the Spirit of St. Louis, and had been the departure point two weeks earlier for the French biplane L'Oiseau Blanc (The White Bird), which took off in an attempt at a transatlantic flight, but then mysteriously disappeared. Howard Hughes flew the second nonstop flight from New York to Paris in 1939, landing at Le Bourget and thereafter continuing onward to Moscow.

On 25 June 1940, Adolf Hitler began his first and only tour of Paris, with Albert Speer and an entourage, from Le Bourget Airport.

Due to capacity constraints at Le Bourget, Air France transferred all of its operations to Orly in 1952.

The Paris Air Show was first held at Le Bourget in 1953, having previously been held at the Grand Palais prior to World War II, and at Orly after the war.

The first jet-powered transcontinental flight, which was a Boeing 707 operated by Pan Am, occurred from Idlewild Airport, New York, to Le Bourget, on October 26, 1958, with a fuel stop in Gander, Newfoundland.

On 16 June 1961, the Soviet ballet dancer Rudolf Nureyev defected at Le Bourget Airport.

In 1977, Le Bourget was closed to international airline traffic and in 1980 to regional airline traffic, but continues serving both domestic and international business aviation. Since 1975, Le Bourget Airport has hosted the Musée de l’air et de l’espace, France's main state-owned aviation museum. Following the discontinuation of regular commercial traffic in 1977, space available to house museum collections and displays has progressively increased.

The airport hosts a statue commemorating Frenchwoman Raymonde de Laroche who was the first woman to earn a pilot's licence. There is also a monument honouring Lindbergh, as well as Nungesser and Coli, pilots of The White Bird.

On 14 April 2016, the Groupe ADP rolled out the Connect 2020 corporate strategy and the commercial brand Paris Aéroport was applied to all Parisian airports, including Le Bourget airport.

Le Bourget has been called "The Teterboro of Europe" because of role it plays in accepting all the business aviation flying into Paris, and the support base.

Facilities
The Bureau d'Enquêtes et d'Analyses pour la Sécurité de l'Aviation Civile (BEA) is headquartered in Building 153 on the grounds of Le Bourget Airport and in Le Bourget. Le Bourget Airport hosts the Musée de l’air et de l’espace, which is also located in the commune of Le Bourget.

Statistics

Accidents and incidents
Lothar von Arnauld de la Perière was killed in 1941 when his plane crashed on takeoff near Le Bourget Airport.
On 29 August 1948, SNCASE Languedoc P/7 F-BATG of Air France crashed at Le Bourget.
On 7 April 1952, SNCASE Languedoc P/7F-BATB of Air France was damaged beyond economic repair when it overran the runway on take-off. The aircraft was operating an international scheduled passenger flight from Le Bourget to Heathrow Airport, London.
On 3 June 1973 a supersonic Tupolev Tu-144 crashed during an aerial display at the Paris Air Show, in an incident known as the 1973 Paris Air Show crash.
On 20 January 1995, a Dassault Falcon 20E operating as Leadair Unijet Flight 001N crashed after takeoff due to an uncontained engine failure caused by a birdstrike.
On 25 July 2000, Air France Flight 4590 attempted to divert to Le Bourget before it crashed shortly after takeoff from Charles de Gaulle Airport.
On 13 August 2010 a Dassault Falcon 50 was damaged beyond repair when its nose gear collapsed during landing.
On 19 November 2010 an Algerian Air Force Lockheed C-130 Hercules excursed from the runway during landing.

In popular culture
Le Bourget Airport is the base for the "Paris Airshow Demonstration Flight" mission supplied with Microsoft Flight Simulator X.
Le Bourget Airport features in the opening sequence of The Protectors episode Your Witness
La Bourget features heavily in Agatha Christie's 1935 novel, Death in the Clouds.
The titular aircraft in Airport '79: Concorde had suffered hydraulic failure during the attack by the rogue F-4 Phantom jet and barreled through two arresting barricades, being stopped, just barely, by the third.
Le Bourget Airport appears in dozens of movies (since the 1930s), sometimes as an active airport others as the Air and Space Museum or through their collection of survivors commercial aircraft used as a set. The terminal could be heavily digitally modified (Mrs. Harris Goes to Paris), acting as an airport in East Berlin (Enigma (1982 film)) but sometimes suggested and represented by other platforms (as seen in The Da Vinci Code -the real one being Brighton City Airport-).

See also
Groupe ADP
Paris Aéroport
Paris Air Show

References

External links

Aéroports de Paris (official site) 
Aéroport de Paris-Le Bourget (Union des Aéroports Français) 
Musée de l'Air et de l'Espace (Musée de l'Air et de l'Espace) 

Airports in Île-de-France
Buildings and structures in Seine-Saint-Denis
Airport Bourget
World War II airfields in France
Airfields of the United States Army Air Forces in France
Airports established in 1919
Art Deco airports
Art Deco architecture in France